Alberte de Campou (born 25 August 1935) is a French sprinter. She competed in the women's 100 metres at the 1952 Summer Olympics.

References

External links
 

1935 births
Living people
Athletes (track and field) at the 1952 Summer Olympics
French female sprinters
Olympic athletes of France
Sportspeople from Bouches-du-Rhône
Olympic female sprinters